Jack Starr's Burning Starr (sometimes called The Orange Album) is the fourth album by heavy metal band Jack Starr's Burning Starr and the last one before they broke up. It was released in 1989 by U.S. Metal Records.

Track listing

Personnel
Mike Tirelli – Vocals
Jack Starr – Guitar
William Fairchild – Bass
Jim Harris – Drums
Edward Spahn – Keyboards
Joe Chinnici - Harmony Guitars

References 

1989 albums